The Stone Mountains are a mountain range in the Central Sudetes on the border of the Czech Republic and Poland.

References

Sudetes
Mountain ranges of the Czech Republic
Mountain ranges of Poland